Olentangy is an unincorporated community in Whetstone Township, Crawford County, Ohio, United States.

History
Olentangy was laid out in 1840. The community takes its name from the nearby Olentangy River.

References

Populated places in Crawford County, Ohio